Laceyella putida  is a bacterium from the genus of Laceyella. Laceyella putida produces chitinase.

References

Further reading

External links
Type strain of Laceyella putida at BacDive -  the Bacterial Diversity Metadatabase	

Bacillales
Bacteria described in 1989